Esther Louise McVey (born 24 October 1967) is a British politician and television presenter serving as the Member of Parliament (MP) for Tatton since 2017. A member of the Conservative Party, she served as Minister of State for Housing and Planning from 2019 to 2020, in the Cabinet as Secretary of State for Work and Pensions from January to November 2018 and as Minister of State for Employment from 2014 to 2015.

Born in Liverpool, McVey was raised in foster care for the first two years of her life and was then raised by her biological family. She was privately educated at The Belvedere School before going on to study at Queen Mary University of London and City, University of London. After working at her family's construction business, she became a television presenter, co-presenting GMTV with Eamonn Holmes.

McVey first entered the House of Commons as MP for Wirral West at the 2010 general election. She served in the Cameron–Clegg coalition as Parliamentary Under-Secretary of State for Disabled People from 2012 to 2013, prior to serving as Minister of State for Employment from 2013 to 2015. She was sworn into the Privy Council in 2014 and attended Cabinet after that year's reshuffle. In the 2015 general election, she lost her seat and spent eighteen months serving as Chair of the British Transport Police Authority before returning to parliament in the 2017 general election, succeeding former Chancellor of the Exchequer George Osborne in Tatton.

McVey served in the second May ministry as Deputy Chief Whip from 2017 to 2018. She was appointed Work and Pensions Secretary in January 2018. In July, she misled the House of Commons over the new Universal Credit scheme by claiming a National Audit Office report showed it should be rolled out faster when in fact the report concluded the roll-out should be paused. Amid calls for her resignation, she apologised to the House. She resigned in November 2018 in opposition to Brexit negotiations and Theresa May's draft Brexit withdrawal agreement. She founded the Blue Collar Conservative parliamentary caucus, before standing in the 2019 Conservative Party leadership election, but was eliminated in the first round after finishing in last place with nine votes. After the contest, she attended Cabinet as Minister of State for Housing and Planning until Boris Johnson's first Cabinet reshuffle. After leaving the Johnson Cabinet, McVey returned to the backbenches and subsequently, with her MP husband (2022) jointly host their weekly programmes titled, 'Friday' "Saturday Morning with Esther and Philip" on GB News and she also regularly writes for the Daily Express Newspaper.

Early life and career 
McVey, of Irish Catholic descent, was born in Liverpool. She spent the first two years of her life in foster care as a Barnardo's child. She was educated at the (at that time fee-paying, independent) Belvedere School, before reading law at Queen Mary University of London (LLB) and radio journalism at City, University of London (MA). In July 2009, McVey graduated from Liverpool John Moores University with the degree of Master of Science (MSc) in corporate governance.

From 2000 to 2006, McVey was a director of her family's Liverpool-based construction business J. G. McVey & Co. (run by her father) which specialised in demolition and site clearance, land reclamation and regeneration. In 2003, the firm received two immediate prohibition safety notices with which it complied. Her father has since said that she was "only there in name".

Media career 
McVey returned to the family business after university, while undertaking a postgraduate course in radio journalism at City University, before embarking on a career in the media, both as a presenter and producer.

McVey was a co-presenter of the summer holiday Children's BBC strand But First This in 1991, and subsequently presented and produced a wide range of programmes, co-hosting GMTV, BBC1's science entertainment series How Do They Do That?, 5's Company, The Heaven and Earth Show, Shopping City, BBC2's youth current affairs programme Reportage and Channel 4's legal series Nothing But The Truth with Ann Widdecombe. She took part in Eve Ensler's The Vagina Monologues at the Empire Theatre, Liverpool.

McVey returned to Liverpool and set up her own business, Making It (UK) Ltd, which provides training for small and medium enterprises as well as providing office space for new startup businesses, which led to her founding Winning Women, supported by funding from the North West Regional Development Agency.

McVey joined GB News in 2021 to present a weekly show with her husband, titled Saturday Morning with Esther and Phillip. In September 2022, in a shakeup of the channel's schedule, it was announced that the pair would present another show on Friday, titled Friday Morning with Esther and Phillip.

Political career 
A supporter of Conservative Way Forward, a Thatcherite organisation, McVey was selected to stand as the Conservative Party candidate in the 2005 general election for the Wirral West constituency, but lost to the sitting Labour MP Stephen Hesford by 1,097 votes.

Member of Parliament for Wirral West (2010–2015)
In the 2010 general election, McVey gained Wirral West on defeating the Labour candidate, Phil Davies, by a 2,436 majority (16,726 votes cast, 42.5% vote share). In 2010, McVey was Parliamentary Private Secretary to then-Employment Minister Chris Grayling. From 2012 to 2013, she was Parliamentary Under-Secretary for Work and Pensions, working under Iain Duncan Smith.

In December 2013, she was formally reprimanded for using House of Commons notepaper and postage to electioneer for the Conservative Party; she apologised and repaid the £300 costs.

David Cameron appointed McVey Minister of State for Employment in the Department for Work and Pensions in an October 2013 reshuffle. McVey was later sworn into the Privy Council on 27 February 2014. Shortly after being made Minister for Employment, McVey had the responsibility for the Health and Safety Executive taken away after it was reported that a demolition company had been found to be in violation of health and safety laws while she was director.

In April 2014 McVey apologised for a tweet criticising the Wirral Labour Party that was issued during the Hillsborough memorial service. Social media posts at the time claimed the timing of the tweet showed a lack of respect.

In November 2014, then-backbench Labour MP John McDonnell discussed a "Sack Esther McVey Day" among Labour activists and politicians, saying that "a whole group in the audience" argued 'Why are we sacking her? Why aren't we lynching the bastard?'" The Conservative Party chairman Grant Shapps called for Labour to withdraw the whip from McDonnell. The official Labour Party Twitter feed said McDonnell's comments "don't represent the views of the Labour Party. He speaks for himself". In 2015, speaking to Robert Peston of ITV, McDonnell defended his comments by saying that he was "simply report[ing] what was shouted out at a public meeting". On the same day as his "lynch" remarks, in a debate in the House of Commons, McDonnell criticised McVey for playing the victim and proceeded to call her a "stain of inhumanity".

Out of parliament (2015–2017)
In the 2015 general election, McVey was defeated by the Labour candidate Margaret Greenwood who gained the Wirral West seat by 417 votes.

After losing her seat, McVey took up the post of chair of the British Transport Police Authority from November 2015, on a four-year contract. However, ten days after it was announced that a 2017 general election would take place, McVey resigned the post. Between the elections she also held part-time jobs as a special adviser to Irish lobbying firm Hume Brophy, a privately-held investment group known as Floreat Group, and a fellowship at the University of Hull.

Member of Parliament for Tatton (2017–present)
In April 2017, McVey was selected to succeed George Osborne as the Conservative candidate for the June 2017 general election in his safe seat of Tatton. She was elected, with around the same vote share as Osborne gained in 2015 (58.6%) (and with a larger number of votes than Osborne gained in any of the four times he stood in an election at Tatton), but with a decreased majority. In a reshuffle prompted by Sir Michael Fallon's resignation as Secretary of State for Defence in the wake of sexual assault allegations, and in which former Chief Whip Gavin Williamson replaced Fallon and his deputy Julian Smith replaced Williamson, McVey was appointed Deputy Chief Government Whip.

Secretary of State for Work and Pensions (2018)
On 8 January 2018, McVey was appointed as Secretary of State for Work and Pensions, a post she held until 15 November 2018 when she resigned over the Brexit deal. Labour MP Dan Carden said McVey's appointment "will put fear in the hearts of the vulnerable and disabled. The last time McVey was at DWP she was ejected from parliament by the voters of Wirral West."

In July 2018 it was reported by the head of the National Audit Office (NAO) that McVey had misled parliament over the new Universal Credit scheme by claiming that the NAO report showed that it should be rolled out faster when in fact the report concluded that the roll-out should be paused. She apologised to the House of Commons on 4 July 2018 amid calls for her resignation. Labour MP Margaret Greenwood said in parliament, "The secretary of state should be ashamed that she has been forced to come to this house again. If she misread this report so badly this brings in to question her competence and her judgment. If she did read the report and chose to misrepresent its findings, she has clearly broken the ministerial code. Either way, she should resign."

McVey said that there were problems with Universal Credit. The Guardian wrote, "Tens of thousands of ESA claimants will receive back-payments of £5,000–£20,000 as a result of what MPs have called a series of 'avoidable' mistakes. The DWP was warned of the error as early as 2014, but failed to take action until 2017."

On 15 November 2018, McVey announced her ministerial resignation over Brexit following May's publication of the draft proposed deal. She was replaced by former Home Secretary Amber Rudd.

It was reported on 27 June 2019 that McVey had received £17,000 for her resignation in severance pay. She was criticised by Labour MP Neil Coyle for taking the payment when she had earlier admitted universal credit had "failings".

Out of Cabinet (2018–2019) 
In March 2019, she was criticised after tweeting a widely discredited claim made in a 2014 newspaper opinion column about the UK, along with other EU states, being forced to join the Euro from 2020, before later deleting it.

Conservative Party leadership campaign (2019) 
In May 2019, McVey announced her intention to run for the leadership of the Conservative Party when Theresa May resigned, claiming that she already had "enough support" to stand. Later that month, McVey launched Blue Collar Conservatives, as part of her leadership campaign, with MPs such as Scott Mann, Iain Duncan Smith and her partner Philip Davies in attendance.

McVey finished in last place after the first ballot of the Conservative Party leadership candidates and was eliminated.

Minister of State for Housing and Planning (2019–2020)

Following Boris Johnson winning the leadership contest and becoming Prime Minister in July 2019, McVey returned to the cabinet when he made her Minister of State for Housing and Planning. In September 2019, during an event on housing at the Conservative Party conference, she received widespread ridicule after she referred to "3D architects, 3D visionaries – doing it with it on a computer" and suggested that this was a new technology. 

McVey later became a correspondent and later a presenter for the right-leaning television channel, GB News. She was criticised by the chair of the Advisory Committee on Business Appointments, Eric Pickles, for breaking anti-lobbying rules within the Ministerial Code in accepting the job at GB News while she was still the housing minister.

She was dismissed in Johnson's post-Brexit reshuffle.

Return to the backbenches
Since returning to the backbenches, McVey has been a critic of her party's lockdown measures during the COVID-19 pandemic and has repeatedly broken the whip to vote against further restrictions. She has also, like several of her Conservative colleagues, gone against her party's agenda by calling for the government to stop building HS2, due to the high-cost, the burden of which she believes will be put on the taxpayer.

McVey endorsed Jeremy Hunt in the July 2022 Conservative Party leadership election. She was his candidate for Deputy Prime Minister.

Personal life
McVey lives in Cheshire, within her Tatton constituency. She was previously in relationships with BBC producer Mal Young and former Conservative frontbencher Ed Vaizey. When in London, she shared a flat in Pimlico with Conservative colleague Philip Davies MP, with whom she has had a "long time on-and-off romantic interest". They were reported to be partners in July 2018. The house-sharing arrangement ended when McVey lost her seat at the 2015 general election. In May 2019 the BBC's Politics Live programme reported that she and Davies were engaged. On 19 September 2020, McVey married Davies in a private ceremony at Westminster, in Parliament's historic St Mary Undercroft chapel, during Covid restrictions.

References

External links

 www.conservatives.com 
 Official blog
 

|-

|-

|-

|-

|-

|-

1967 births
Living people
21st-century British women politicians
Alumni of City, University of London
Alumni of Liverpool John Moores University
Alumni of the University of London
Alumni of Westfield College
British broadcaster-politicians
British television personalities
Businesspeople from Liverpool
Conservative Party (UK) MPs for English constituencies
English people of Irish descent
English television presenters
Female members of the Cabinet of the United Kingdom
Female members of the Parliament of the United Kingdom for English constituencies
Members of the Privy Council of the United Kingdom
People educated at The Belvedere Academy
Politicians from Liverpool
UK MPs 2010–2015
UK MPs 2017–2019
UK MPs 2019–present
Ministers of State for Housing (UK)
GB News newsreaders and journalists
21st-century English women
21st-century English people
Spouses of British politicians